The American Association of Teachers of French (AATF) is a professional organisation for teachers of French in the United States founded in 1927. Teachers may be involved in primary, secondary, or university education. Additionally, retired and student teachers are welcome. Currently there are about 10,000 members. As the interest in French has declined in the United States since 1980's, the organisation has held annual convention to bring together a cross-section of teachers and educators to find ways to promote French in traditional curriculum and other methods.

The AATF's official publication is called The French Review, which has the largest circulation of any scholarly journal on the French language. Carine Bourget, Professor of French and Francophone Studies at the University of Arizona, is its editor in chief. Michel Gueldry of Missouri Science and Technology is the current managing editor.

National French Contest
The National French Contest was established in 1936 by the Executive Council of AATF to help determine the relative student achievement in the learning of French in the United States. Originally the contest was called Le Grand Concours National de Français but was later shortened to Le Grand Concours.

The annual contest currently has around 100,000 participants from elementary schools to high schools in all chapters nationwide. There are seven levels. The first level called FLES is for elementary school students. Levels 01, and 1 to 5 are for grades 7 to 12. In each level, there are divisions A to E to separate students based on prior exposure to French. About 0.1% of all participants receive gold medals for National Rank 1. About 0.7% receive silver medals for National Ranks 2 to 3. About 8% receive bronze medals for National Ranks 4 to 10.

See also
American Council on the Teaching of Foreign Languages
American Association of Teachers of German

References

External links

Language education in the United States
French language in the United States